Tony Nilsson is a Swedish singer-songwriter (born in Boden, Norrbotten County, Sweden in 1977). He is signed to Peermusic. A prolific composer of songs, he has contributed to a string of hits by well-known Swedish artists. Many of his songs have featured in Melodifestivalen and in the Swedish Singles Chart. Nilsson lives with artist and fellow songwriter Mirja Breitholtz.

Nilsson had a hit with "Natalie", a song he had written. It was featured in 2006 in the compilation album Absolute Summerhits 2006. In 2007, a cover version by Ola Svensson became a huge summer hit in Sweden.

In 2010 he wrote the song "If You Love Me", which was recorded and released by British X Factor winner Joe McElderry. 
The same year Nilsson started collaborating with Swedish singer Darin. Together they wrote "Can't Stop Love" for the Swedish royal wedding and most of the other songs on Darin's album Lovekiller. The album went straight to No. 1 in the charts and was certified gold after only one week.

Discography

Songs in Melodifestivalen
2008: 
"Love in Stereo" by Ola Svensson (co-written with Mirja Breitholtz), Round 2 of Andra Chansen
2009: 
"Disconnect Me" by Marie Serneholt (co-written with Peter Boström), 6th place (Semi-final)
"The Queen" by Velvet (Jenny Pettersson) (co-written with Henrik Jansson), 6th place (Semi-final)
2010: 
"Doctor Doctor" by Elin Lanto (co-written with Mirja Breitholtz), 7th place (Semi-final)
"The Saviour" by Anders Ekborg (co-written with Henrik Jansson), 6th place (Semi-final)
"Headlines" by Alcazar (co-written with Peter Boström), Round 1 of Andra Chansen
"You're Out of My Life" by Darin Zanyar (co-written with Henrik Jansson), 4th place
2011:
"Like Suicide" by Christian Walz (co-written with Fernando Fuentes and Henrik Jansson), 5th place (Semi-final)
2012:
"Goosebumps" by Hanna Lindblad (co-written with Hanna Lindblad and Linda Sundblad), 7th place (Semi-final)
"Shout It Out" by David Lindgren (co-written with Fernando Fuentes), 4th place

Other Songs
2007: "Natalie" by Ola Svensson 
2007: "S.O.S." by Ola Svensson
2010: "If You Love Me" by Joe McElderry (b-side to Ambitions single)
2010: "Lovekiller" by Darin
2010: "Microphone" by Darin
2010: "Can't Stop Love" by Darin
2011: "Hit the Lights" by Selena Gomez & The Scene
2011: "DNA" by Aynur Aydın
2012: "Loaded" by Agnes
2012: "Human Touch" by Agnes
2012: "Watching It Burn" by Agnes
2012: "Like God" by Agnes
2012: "Better than You" (feat. Rita Ora) by Conor Maynard
2012: "Headphones" by Conor Maynard
2012: "Nobody Knows" by Darin
2012: "Perfect Crime" by David Lindgren
2012: "Encore" by David Lindgren
2013: "Intro" by David Lindgren
2013: "Move That Thing" by David Lindgren
2013: "Back 2 Life" by David Lindgren
2013: "Ignite" by David Lindgren
2013: "Armagedon" by David Lindgren
2013: "Requiem" by Ulrik Munther

References

External links
Tony Nilsson official website

Swedish songwriters
Melodifestivalen contestants
1977 births
Living people
People from Boden Municipality